Pierre Charles Parrain (29 April 1904 – 12 November 1984) was a French sprinter. He competed in the men's 200 metres at the 1924 Summer Olympics.

References

External links
 

1904 births
1984 deaths
Athletes (track and field) at the 1924 Summer Olympics
French male sprinters
Olympic athletes of France